World Comes Calling is a second and final studio album by New Zealand rock band Midnight Youth. It was released in October 2011.

Track listing
  The Street
  Down Inside
  Won’t Stop
  Who Said You’re Free
  Come One, Come All
  World Comes Calling
  Too Young To Wonder
  Listen
  French Girl
  Mark My Words

Charts

References

2011 albums
Midnight Youth albums